This is a list of destinations that were served by the now defunct Estonian Air.

Europe
Austria
Vienna – Vienna International Airport seasonal

Belgium
Brussels – Brussels Airport
Croatia
Split – Split Airport seasonal
Denmark
Copenhagen – Copenhagen Airport
Estonia
Tallinn – Lennart Meri Tallinn Airport (also known as Ülemiste Airport) Hub
France
Paris – Charles de Gaulle Airport seasonal
Nice – Nice Côte d'Azur Airport seasonal
Germany
Munich – Munich Airport seasonal
Berlin – Berlin Tegel Airport seasonal
Hamburg - Hamburg Airport
Italy
Milan – Malpensa Airport seasonal 
Lithuania
Vilnius – Vilnius International Airport
Netherlands
Amsterdam – Amsterdam Schiphol Airport
Norway
Oslo – Oslo Gardermoen Airport
Trondheim – Trondheim Airport 
Russia
Saint Petersburg – Pulkovo Airport
Sweden
Stockholm – Stockholm-Arlanda Airport
Stockholm - Stockholm Bromma Airport
Örebro - Örebro Airport
Turkey
Antalya – Antalya Airport seasonal 
Ukraine
Kyiv – Boryspil Airport
United Kingdom
London – London Gatwick Airport

Terminated destinations
 Belarus – Minsk National Airport
 Croatia – Dubrovnik Airport
 Estonia – Kärdla Airport, Kuressaare Airport, Tartu Airport
 Finland – Helsinki Airport, Joensuu Airport, Jyväskylä Airport, Kajaani Airport, Tampere-Pirkkala Airport
 Georgia – Tbilisi Airport
 Germany – Frankfurt Airport, Hamburg Airport, Hannover Airport
 Greece – Athens International Airport "Eleftherios Venizelos"
 Ireland – Dublin Airport
 Italy – Bergamo Airport, Rome Fiumicino Airport, Venice Marco Polo Airport
 Latvia – Riga Airport
 Spain – Barcelona–El Prat Airport
 Sweden – Göteborg Landvetter Airport, Växjö Småland Airport
 Ukraine – Simferopol International Airport
 United Kingdom – Manchester Airport

References

Lists of airline destinations
SAS Group destinations

et:Estonian Air#Sihtpunktid